2 States is a 2014 Indian Hindi-language romantic comedy-drama film directed by Abhishek Varman and produced by Karan Johar and Sajid Nadiadwala. Based on Chetan Bhagat's 2009 novel of the same name with story written by Varman and Bhagat, the film stars Arjun Kapoor and Alia Bhatt with Amrita Singh, Ronit Roy, Revathi and Shiv Kumar Subramaniam in supporting roles.

Distributed by UTV Motion Pictures, 2 States opened in global cinemas on 18 April 2014. Praised for its music, cast performances, story and direction, the film earned  in worldwide markets, thus emerging as a critical and commercial success. It is Kapoor's biggest commercial success to date. At the 60th Filmfare Awards, 2 States received 8 nominations, including Best Film, Best Director (Varman), Best Supporting Actor (Roy) and Best Supporting Actress (Singh), and won 2 awards – Best Music Director (Shankar–Ehsaan–Loy) and Best Debut Director (Varman).

Plot 
Krish Malhotra, a fresh Engineer from IIT Delhi, now a student pursuing his MBA at the IIM Ahmedabad, Gujarat, comes from a troubled, rich family of Punjabi Hindu origin based in New Delhi. His mother, Kavita, is often shown having a troubled relationship with his alcoholic father, Vikram Malhotra. He meets his classmate Ananya Swaminathan, who comes from a conservative Tamil Brahmin family. Ananya, though an economics topper, is unable to answer a simple question by her professor who chides her in turn. Ananya finds that Krish is a genius and starts taking his help in academics. Krish is attracted to Ananya and can not control himself. Therefore, he plans to call off his friendship with her (Krish is distracted too much by her for him to focus on studies), however she kisses him. Soon they begin dating and stay together for their next 22 months on the IIM campus. Krish confides in Ananya that his real passion is writing, which he wants to pursue a career in. Krish gets selected in the campus drives for Yes Bank. He immediately rushes to the next room and proposes to Ananya, in the middle of her interview. She accepts and then gets selected for Sunsilk.

When they complete their graduation, Krish and Ananya decide to get married. They introduce their parents to each other at the convocation ceremony. To their dismay, Krish's loud Punjabi mother Kavita, does not get along with Ananya's reserved Tamil parents Radha and her husband, Shiv. 

After graduation, Ananya begins her marketing job in her hometown Chennai, and Krish goes back to his own hometown New Delhi, with the choice of the workplace in his own hands. Krish's brash family urge him to stay in New Delhi and try to discourage him from his interest in writing. They also criticize his relationship with Ananya and tell him to get into an arranged marriage with a Punjabi girl. It is also evident that there is tension between Krish and his alcoholic father. Much to his dysfunctional family‘s chagrin, and missing Ananya, Krish shifts his job to Chennai. 

During this time, he tries very hard to win over Ananya's family. He initially steps on the rangoli at the entrance of their house and, unintentionally, messes it up, which upsets Ananya's father. Gradually, he builds a rapport with the family. He tutors her younger brother for the IIT entrance, gets her mother an opportunity to sing for an event at his workplace, and helps Ananya's father create his first PowerPoint presentation.

With his efforts, when Krish symbolically proposes to each member of the family, Ananya's family agrees to the marriage. Krish and Ananya then travel to New Delhi to win over Krish's family. Initially, Kavita and her family are hostile towards Ananya but slowly come to like her after she saves Krish's cousin's wedding from being canceled due to a dispute over an excessive dowry.

Krish and Ananya decide to take a vacation in Mumbai with their families before the wedding. The vacation does not go as planned when Kavita makes continuous snide remarks about Tamilian culture. Furthermore, Ananya and her parents overhear Krish falsely assuring his mother that she can treat Ananya however she wants after they are married. Having had enough of the insults Ananya breaks up with Krish, and both go their separate ways.

Krish and Ananya find it hard to live without each other. Krish becomes a workaholic and becomes depressed and starts writing about his story with Ananya. He also visits her in Chennai, where she warns him to stop communication. Sometime later, he gets a call from Ananya, who reveals that Vikram had secretly come down to Chennai to speak to her parents, apologizing for his wife's shallow behavior in an effort to change their decision. 

This allows for Krish and Ananya to finally get married, with Krish and his family traveling by train to Chennai for the wedding. His father initially says that he will not attend the wedding to prevent any further embarrassment, but at the last minute, he flies down to Chennai with Krish seeing his rental car outside of the hotel, and to the surprise of his mother, announcing that his father has come to the wedding, before the ceremony. Vikram apologizes to Kavita for his abusive behavior over the years.

After getting married, Ananya gives birth to twin boys. Krish resigns from his job at the bank and publishes his book 2 States based on his and Ananya's life.

Cast 

 Arjun Kapoor as Krish Malhotra, Ananya's husband, Kavita and Vikram's son, Shiv and Radha’s son-in law
 Alia Bhatt as Ananya Malhotra (née Swaminathan), Krish's wife, Shiv and Radha's daughter, Kavita and Vikram’s daughter-in-law.
 Amrita Singh as Kavita Mehra Malhotra. Krish's mother, Ananya’s mother-in law, Vikram’s wife
 Ronit Roy as Vikram Malhotra. Krish's father, Ananya’s father-in-law, Kavita’s husband.
 Revathi as Radha Swaminathan, Ananya's mother, Krish's mother-in-law, Shiv's wife
 Shiv Kumar Subramaniam as Shiv Swaminathan, Ananya's father, Krish's father-in-law, Radha's husband
 Sharang Natrajan as Manju Swaminathan, Shiv and Radha's son, Ananya's brother, Krish's brother-in-law
 Amit Bhargav as Harish (Ananya's proposed husband)
 Achint Kaur as Shipra Mehra (Krish's aunt)
 Dilip Merala as Mohit Oberoi (Krish's classmate)
 Aru Krishansh Verma as Dharamveer "Duke"
 Bikramjeet Kanwarpal as Rajji Mama
 Neil Shah as Ramanuj
 Madhu Anand Chandhock as Duke's Mother

Production

Casting 
The first choice for the lead pair in the film had been Saif Ali Khan and Priyanka Chopra and the film was to be directed by Siddharth Anand. Later, it was announced that Shah Rukh Khan and Asin Thottumkal would play lead roles and the film was to be directed by Vishal Bhardwaj. The role of Krish Malhotra was also offered to Imran Khan, who instead chose to work on Matru Ki Bijlee Ka Mandola (2013). Finally, Arjun Kapoor was cast as the lead. The female lead was then offered to Anushka Sharma, who rejected it as she didn't find the role interesting enough, and later Alia Bhatt signed on. Amrita Singh and Ronit Roy were cast as Arjun Kapoor's parents, and Revathi and Shiv Kumar Subramaniam were cast as Alia Bhatt's parents.

Filming 
Principal photography commenced on 29 January 2013 with the shooting of a song. Parts of the film were shot at Chennai, Delhi, IIM-A and Gol Limda Bhajiya House near Astodia Darwaza, Ahmedabad Railway Station to Police commissioner office in Ahmedabad in August 2013. Alia sported an Indian Fusion look in the film and her costumes were designed by Manish Malhotra. Speaking about her character, Alia said that she is a City Girl who speaks Tamil only with her parents. It was given a U/A certificate by the censor board

The song "Offo" was choreographed and conceptualized by Remo D'Souza as a celebration of several Indian festivals in a time lapse of almost one year. It was shot over four days at IIM Ahmedabad campus and Filmistan Studio in Mumbai.

Soundtrack 

The film score was composed by Tubby-Parik while the songs were composed by Shankar–Ehsaan–Loy, while the lyrics for the songs were penned by Amitabh Bhattacharya. The first song, Offo, sung by Aditi Singh Sharma and Amitabh Bhattacharya, released on 7 March 2014. The second song, Locha-E-Ulfat, sung by Benny Dayal, released on 13 March 2014. The soundtrack of the film released on 16 March 2014. The medley song "Isaiyin Alai" at the concert was sung by Mahalaxmi Iyer. Shankar–Ehsaan–Loy won the Filmfare Award for Best Music Director and the IIFA Award for Best Music Director for the film's soundtrack. The songs "Offo", "Mast Magan", "Uski Uski","Locha E Ulfat", "Chandaniya" were declared chartbusters.

Release

Theatrical 
2 States's teaser trailer was released along with Hasee Toh Phasee, which released on 7 February 2014.

Box office

India 
The film was declared a "Super Hit" by Box Office India in light of its first two days' performance.

International 
According to Box Office India, 2 States grossed US$5.85 million internationally, and was the second highest overseas grosser of 2014 in Bollywood after Jai Ho at that point.

Critical reception 

Taran Adarsh of Bollywood Hungama awarded the film 4.5 out of 5 stars, and noted, "On the whole, 2 States is one of the finest movies to come out of the Hindi film industry of late. This is one of those rare Hindi movies that commands a repeat viewing. Strongly recommended!" Critic Saurabh Dwivedi, writing for India Today, gave the film 4 out of 5 stars, and published, "2 States can be a good mirror for parents to understand their children. So take along your parents and enjoy the film." Meena Iyer of The Times of India gave the film 3.5 out of 5 stars, and wrote, "What makes 2 States work is the simple narrative told humorously. Adapted as it is, from one of author Chetan Bhagat's best-selling works, the film, just like the book before it, is light-hearted. Chetan's funny one-liners and life-view are studiously borrowed by the director for his screen outing. And though there is a sense of deja-vu, for those who have read the book, the movie still manages to charm and surprise." Paloma Sharma of Rediff.com gave the movie 3.5 out of 5 stars and opined, "There's nothing that should keep you from watching 2 States". Mohar Basu of Koimoi gave the film 3 out of 5 stars, and wrote, "2 States is barely unwatchable but misses the magic of Chetan Bhagat's novel. As a stand-alone, it is endearingly done with Alia and Arjun's scorching chemistry coming off as adorable. The Bhagat fan in me is disappointed, but the cinemagoer isn't." DNA posted, the first half of the film is light and breezy and the second dramatic and emotional, perhaps a better balance would have helped the post-interval portion which seems heavy.

Hindustan Times Anupama Chopra gave the film 2.5 stars out of 5, and said, "In 2 States, the story is the weakest link. The film is bolstered by talented actors, gorgeous songs by Shankar-Ehsaan-Loy, nice styling, sumptuous production design, and a few sparkling moments. But in the second half, 2 States falls apart. At almost two-and-a-half hours, it's also stretched so thin that by the time Krish and Ananya walk into the sunset, you are long past caring". Concerning Kapoor and Bhatt, she said, "Arjun, departing from his earlier violent roles, makes a nicely goofy and later subdued lover boy, but it's Alia who lights up the screen." Saibal Chatterjee of NDTV gave the film 2.5 out of 5 stars, and wrote, "2 States is a cross-culture love story that strives to be sweet, funny and emotionally wrenching all at once. It is occasionally funny and sweet in parts all right, but the family drama at the film's core has a severely stultified feel. The trouble is that the impending wedding remains impending far too long to sustain interest... it sets out to be a slice-of-life drama about a real couple grappling with the politics of inter-community marriage, but it fails to generate enough energy and warmth to draw the audience into a tight clinch". Shubra Gupta of The Indian Express gave the film 2.5 out of 5 stars, and said, "2 States... sets out to be a solid, emotionally satisfying rom-com, and goes well for a bit but then turns into a too-stretched-out 'jhagda' between the two sets of North-South parents. The smooth, engaging first half descends, post-interval, into mopey melodrama, and I got impatient waiting for the inevitable resolution." She praised Bhatt's performance, saying, "...Alia Bhatt is a surprise. She leaves behind her earlier films, and gets into her character: she may not be an authentic 'Southie' in terms of body language, but she is all girl, easy and fresh and natural."

Awards 
21st Screen Awards:
 Best Film Marketing

60th Filmfare Awards:
 Best Music Director – Shankar–Ehsaan–Loy
 Best Debut Director – Abhishek Varman
 Nominated – Best Film – Karan Johar and Sajid Nadiadwala
 Nominated – Best Director – Abhishek Varman
 Nominated – Best Supporting Actor – Ronit Roy
 Nominated – Best Supporting Actress – Amrita Singh
 Nominated – Best Male Playback Singer – Arijit Singh for "Mast Magan"
 Nominated – Best Male Playback Singer – Benny Dayal for "Locha-E-Ulfat"

7th Mirchi Music Awards:
 Album of The Year – Shankar–Ehsaan–Loy, Amitabh Bhattacharya
 Music Composer of The Year – Shankar–Ehsaan–Loy for "Mast Magan"
 Nominated – Song representing Sufi tradition – "Mast Magan"
 Nominated – Best Background Score – Tubby-Park

Remake 
The film has been remade in Telugu with the same name starring Adivi Sesh and Shivani.

References

External links 
 
 
 

2014 films
2010s Hindi-language films
2014 romantic comedy films
Indian romantic comedy films
Films based on Indian novels
Films set in Ahmedabad
Films set in India
Films shot in Ahmedabad
Films shot in Delhi
Films shot in Tamil Nadu
Films set in Gujarat
Films set in Delhi
Films set in Chennai
UTV Motion Pictures films
Hindi films remade in other languages